Spörer is a lunar impact crater that lies just to the north of the crater Herschel, and southeast of the lava-flooded Flammarion. To the southeast is Gyldén, and to the northeast is Réaumur.

Its diameter is 26 km. The crater is named after German astronomer Gustav Spörer.

The floor of this crater has been flooded with basaltic lava, leaving only a shallow rim above the surface. The narrow rim is roughly circular but irregular and broken in several locations. The rim has a slight outward bulge to the northwest. The interior of the crater is level and featureless.

Satellite craters

By convention these features are identified on lunar maps by placing the letter on the side of the crater midpoint that is closest to Spörer.

References

External links

Spörer at the Moon Wiki

Impact craters on the Moon